Cham Khalifeh (also Romanized as Cham Khalīfeh and Cham-e Khalīfeh) is a village in Saman Rural District, Saman County, Chaharmahal and Bakhtiari Province, Iran. At the 2006 census, its population was 885, in 233 families. The village is populated by Turkic people.

References 

Populated places in Saman County